The Flying Fool is a 1929 aviation-themed film produced and distributed by Pathé Exchange as both a silent film and sound film just as Hollywood was transitioning to filming with sound. Tay Garnett directed and William Boyd, Russell Gleason and Marie Prevost starred.

Plot
After an World War I aerial battle over French lines, Bill Taylor (William Boyd) is honoured as an ace. After the war, he continues flying as a barnstormer, known as the "Flying Fool". His kid-brother, Jimmy (Russell Gleason), is one of his crew. Jimmy falls in love with a nightclub singer, Pat Riley (Marie Prevost). His older-brother worries that Jimmy may be involved with the wrong kind of girl.

Bill decides to check on Pat out and he finds she is a sweet and home-loving daughter working to provide for her mother. To his surprise, he also falls for her, and this upsets Jimmy.

Both brothers take to their aircraft to decide which of them will win Pat. After a thrilling air "battle," Bill and Jimmy land safely. Pat decides she loves Bill, and Jimmy transfers his affections to another pretty girl.

Cast

 William Boyd as Bill Taylor
 Marie Prevost as Pat Riley
 Tom O'Brien as Tom Dugan
 Russell Gleason as Jimmy Taylor
 Kate Bruce as Mrs. Riley, Pat's Mother
 Dan Wolheim as Airport Manager
 Dorothy Ward as Mae Hopper

Production
According to her journal entry for 1929, aviatrix Pancho Barnes flew in The Flying Fool. Noted stunt pilot Frank Clarke along with his friends, Leon Nomis, Roy Wilson and Dick Rinaldi, also flew in the film.

The shooting locale was the Metropolitan Airport in Los Angeles where two Travel Air 4000 aircraft (one painted white with "The Flying Fool" on its fuselage) were flown.

Reception
Aviation film historian Stephen Pendo, in Aviation in the Cinema (1985) noted The Flying Fool was an "all dialogue" (another catch phrase for a sound film or "talkie". He also wrote, "noted cameraman Arthur Miller lensed the film."

Aviation film historian James Farmer in Celluloid Wings: The Impact of Movies on Aviation (1984) considered The Flying Fool, an example of a film that benefitted from "... excellent aerial sequences."

References

Notes

Citations

Bibliography

 Farmer, James H. Celluloid Wings: The Impact of Movies on Aviation (1st ed.). Blue Ridge Summit, Pennsylvania: TAB Books 1984. .
 Paris, Michael. From the Wright Brothers to Top Gun: Aviation, Nationalism, and Popular Cinema. Manchester, UK: Manchester University Press, 1995. .
 Pendo, Stephen. Aviation in the Cinema. Lanham, Maryland: Scarecrow Press, 1985. .

External links
 
 
 
 The Flying Fool available for free download at Internet Archive

1929 films
Films directed by Tay Garnett
Pathé Exchange films
American aviation films
1929 comedy films
Silent American comedy films
American black-and-white films
1920s American films